The Manse may refer to:

 The Manse (Northampton, Massachusetts), listed on the NRHP in Massachusetts
The Manse (Natchez, Mississippi), listed on the NRHP in Mississippi
The Manse, Mount Druitt, a museum in Sydney, Australia

See also
Manse (disambiguation)